Vasily Vasilyevich Kuptsov (1899–1935) was a Russian painter. He is known for his 1934 work Maxim Gorky ANT-20, which depicts a Tupolev ANT-20 in flight.

References

External links
 Купцов Василий Васильевич (1899-1935)

1899 births
1935 deaths
Russian artists
1935 suicides
Suicides by hanging in the Soviet Union
Soviet painters